Laughing Boy is a 1929 novel by Oliver La Farge about the struggles of the Navajo in Southwestern United States to reconcile their culture with that of the United States. It won the Pulitzer Prize in 1930.

It was adapted as a film of the same name, released in 1934.

Plot
The novel is set in 1915, when the first motorized vehicle was driven into Native American territory.  It concerns a boy named Laughing Boy who seeks to become an adult who can be respected among his Navajo tribe. They live in a place known as T'o Tlakai. He has been initiated into tribal ways, is an accomplished jeweler, and can compete favorably at events such as racing wild horses, which he has either caught or capably traded at market.

At a tribal event, Laughing Boy encounters a beautiful, mysterious young woman known as Slim Girl, and the two are soon attracted to each other.  Complications arise immediately from her past experiences in the Indian Schools, boarding schools run under the auspices of the federal government for education and assimilation of Native Americans.  Native American children were sent to these schools from numerous tribes, where they were forced to abandon their individual languages and cultures and instead adopt the English language and Western cultural standards.

These complications affect both his family's view of the relationship, and the relationship itself in ways that slowly unfold and intertwine as the novel progresses. It offers a rare glimpse into the Navajo lifestyle and territory.

The novel was awarded the Pulitzer Prize for Fiction and was published as an Armed Services Edition during WWII.

Adaptation
In 1934, Laughing Boy was adapted as a film of the same name, directed by W. S. Van Dyke.  It starred Ramón Novarro as Laughing Boy and Lupe Vélez as Slim Girl.

Censorship
The book was removed from high school library shelves by the board of education of the Island Trees Union Free School District in New York. This case became the subject of a U.S. Supreme Court case in 1982.

References

External links
 

1929 American novels
Pulitzer Prize for the Novel-winning works
Houghton Mifflin books
American novels adapted into films
English-language books
Censored books